The Bergamasque dialect  is the western variant of the Eastern Lombard group of the Lombard language. It is mainly spoken in the province of Bergamo and in the area around Crema, in central Lombardy.

Bergamasque has official status in the province of Bergamo, according to the Regional Law 25/2016.

Classification
Bergamasque is a Romance language and belongs to the Gallo-Italic branch. Its position on the language family is genetically closer to Occitan, Catalan, French, etc. than to Italian.

Geographic distribution
Bergamasque is primarily spoken in the province of Bergamo and in the area around Crema, in central Lombardy.

Bergamasque is generally mutually intelligible for speakers of Eastern Lombard's variants  of neighbouring areas (i.e. from Brescia) but this is not always true for distant peripheric areas, especially in alpine valleys. Differences include either lexical, grammatical and phonetic aspects. Bergamasque is often referred to as a dialect of the Italian language; this is not entirely correct, as Bergamasque and Italian are not mutually intelligible.

Following the migrations of the 19th and 20th centuries, the Bergamo dialect was transplanted and is spoken in various communities of southern Brazil, for example in the municipality of Botuverá.

Speakers 
Monolingual Bergamasque speakers are now virtually non-existent. All Lombard speakers also speak Italian, and their command of each of the two languages varies according to their geographical position as well as their socio-economic situation, the most reliable predictor being the speakers' age.

Samples of literary works in Bergamasque

Another example 

The Lord's Prayer

English- 

Our Father who art in heaven, Hallowed be thy name. Thy kingdom come. Thy will be done on earth as it is in heaven. Give us this day our daily bread,
and forgive us our trespasses, as we forgive those who trespass against us, and lead us not into temptation, but deliver us from evil.

Italian-

Bergamasque-

Bibliography 
Bortolo Belotti, Storia di Bergamo e dei bergamaschi.
Carmelo Francia, Emanuele Gambarini, Dizionario italiano-bergamasco, Bergamo, Grafital, 2001.
Carmelo Francia, Emanuele Gambarini, Dizionario bergamasco-italiano, Bergamo, Grafital, 2004.
Umberto Zanetti, La grammatica bergamasca, Bergamo, Sestante, 2004. .

References

External links 
 Orbilat - An interesting site more for western lombard, but the map of the distribution of the two main varieties is noteworthy.
Italian/Bergamasque Dictionary - Carmelo Francia, Emanuele Gambarini - Ducato di piazza Pontida
 Ducato di piazza Pontida (folkloristical and linguistic association)
Difficult phrases in Bergamasque 
 A collection of comedies in Bergamasque
 a Casiratese-Italian vocabulary, a dictionary for the Bergamasque variety of Casirate d'Adda village, in Italian.

Eastern Lombard language